Oberonia attenuata, commonly known as the Mossman fairy orchid, is a plant in the orchid family and is a small epiphyte. It has between four and seven leaves in a fan-like arrangement and large numbers of tiny reddish brown flowers on a pendulous flowering stem. It is only known from Mossman Gorge. The species was first formally described in 1960 but no further observations of the species were made, and it was presumed extinct until 2015.

Description
The flowering stem has whorls of tiny thread-like bracts. The sepals and petals spread widely apart from each other. The side lobes spread horizontally and the middle lobe points downwards. Flowering occurs between May and September.<

Taxonomy and naming
Oberonia attenuata was first formally described in 1960 by Alick Dockrill who published the description in The North Queensland Naturalist from a specimen he collected near the Mossman River. The specific epithet (attenuata) is a Latin word meaning "drawn out", "tapered", "weakened" or "thin".

Distribution and habitat
The Mossman fairy orchid has been seen growing on a rainforest tree near a watercourse. It is only known from near the Mossman Gorge. It had not been seen its first description and was presumed extinct until another plant was found in 2015.<ref name="environment">{{cite web |title=Oberonia attenuata' - Mossman fairy orchid |url=http://www.environment.gov.au/cgi-bin/sprat/public/publicspecies.pl?taxon_id=5388 |publisher=Australian Government Department of the Environment |accessdate=15 January 2019}}</ref>

Conservation
This orchid was listed as "extinct" until its rediscovery in 2015. It is now listed as "critically endangered" under the Australian Government Environment Protection and Biodiversity Conservation Act 1999 and as "endangered" under the Queensland Government Nature Conservation Act 1992''.

References

attenuata
Endemic orchids of Australia
Plants described in 1960
Orchids of Queensland